Bent's New Fort was a historic fort and trading post along the banks of the Arkansas River in what is now Bent County, Colorado, about nine miles west of Lamar, on the Mountain Route branch of the Santa Fe Trail. William Bent operated a trading post with limited success at the site and in 1860 leased the fort to the United States government, which operated it as a military outpost until 1867. In 1862, it was named Fort Lyon. The fort was abandoned after a flood of the Arkansas River in 1867.

The ruins of the fort and a portion of the Santa Fe Trail were listed as Santa Fe Trail Mountain Route-Bent's New Fort on the U.S. National Register of Historic Places in 2016.

Description

In 1849, William Bent built a wooden stockade for a fort and trading post. It was a U-shaped structure of three connected log cabins. The open side faced the Arkansas River.

He then built a rectangular limestone or sandstone trading post and fort in the summer and early fall of 1853. Built near the Cheyenne and Arapaho camping ground, Big Timbers, the fort was a little smaller than the adobe Bent's Old Fort, which had been destroyed by fire by Bent in 1849 during a severe cholera epidemic that decimated the southern Cheyenne. The new building, with 16-foot walls, had twelve rooms built around a central courtyard. For defense, cannons sat in the corners of the roof and there were parapets.

The new fort was built on a hill overlooking the Arkansas River with a view for miles of the Santa Fe Trail. In a defensive position, it was situated between a limestone cliff to the east and a rock bluff to the south.

The fort was staffed by about ten Native American, French-Canadian, Mexican, and white American men. Described as a "motley crew", some of the men had been trappers. Most had at least one Native American wife.

History

Sufficient merchandise had arrived so that Bent could resume trading with Native Americans. However, Bent had not been able to sustain trading to the same levels of the 1830s and 1840s at the Old Fort. The steady stream of westward travelers had reduced wildlife, including buffalo. For example, cutting down cottonwood trees adversely affecting habitat for wildlife, reducing game available for hunting. The fur trade had also declined significantly. All of this resulted in hunger among Native Americans and fewer buffalo hides that could be traded for goods. For instance, the Arapaho, led by Little Raven, who camped near the fort had difficulty sustaining life by 1857 and children had distended stomachs from starvation. Hunger, plans for a railroad to cut through Cheyenne and Arapaho hunting grounds, and the increased pressure of settlers resulted in apprehension among Native Americans.

This new trading post was not profitable and in July 1857, Bent leased it briefly to the United States Army and ran it again as a trading post. By 1860, an area near the fort was a distribution point for annuity goods for the Cheyenne and Arapaho, who were starving and in need of the provisions as they headed east for a buffalo hunt; "their women and children had become very faint and hungry." Bent refused to use the fort as storage facilities because it would become a potential area of conflict and theft. Annuity goods were provided by treaties in exchange for reduced access to ancestral land, such as hunting grounds.

In July 1860, the Army rented the facility and used it for storage of annuity goods for the Cheyenne and Arapaho. Barracks were built around the fort and additional defensive features were added, like diamond-shaped gun emplacements on newly-erected earthenworks that surrounded the fort. It was initially named Fort Flaunteroy. It was then named Fort Wise, and finally Fort Lyon. The Army was located at the fort until 1867 when it moved to the new Fort Lyon fort following flooding of the Arkansas River. The site was not used after the Army relocated.

When Bent leased the fort to the Army, he moved to south side of the Arkansas River at the mouth of the Purgatoire River near Boggsville and built a stockade called Purgatory Stockade. He lived there until his death in 1869. All that remains are ruins of the foundation of the former fort. The fort is on private land.

Notes

References

National Register of Historic Places in Bent County, Colorado
Archaeological sites on the National Register of Historic Places in Colorado
1853 establishments in the United States
Santa Fe Trail
Bent County, Colorado
Forts in Colorado
Archaeological sites in Colorado